Christopher J. Hardy (born 1955) is an American physicist and inventor of several magnetic resonance imaging (MRI) subsystem technologies for use in real time MRI and cardiac MR imaging and spectroscopy.

Biography
Hardy obtained his Ph.D. from the University of Illinois at Urbana-Champaign in March, 1983. He is currently a principal scientist and Coolidge Fellow at General Electric. He developed the first graphical approach that allowed physicians to explore anatomy in real time during cardiac MRI, as opposed to viewing groups of images at a later time, and he also developed a technique that improved imaging speed. Both accomplishments have gained widespread use. He has also led the teams that developed 32 channel and 128 channel General Electric MRI systems.

Hardy has written 98 research papers and 54 patents.

Awards and honors
 1986,1993 Inventor of the Year, Eastern New York Patent Law Association
 1988 Distinguished Inventor, Intellectual Property Owners, Inc. (Washington, DC)
 1989, 1994, 1997, 2005 GE Whitney Gallery of Technical Achievers / Whitney Award
 1996 GE Gold Patent Medallion
 2002 Fellow, American Physical Society 
 2003 Fellow, American Institute for Medical and Biological Engineering 
 2008 Redington Award for Imaging Technologies
 2010 Fellow, International Society for Magnetic Resonance in Medicine 
 2010 GE Coolidge Fellow
 2011, 2012 Distinguished Reviewer, Magn Reson Med, J Magn Reson Imag

Selected works

Selected Patents
 Hardy, Christopher J,  " Method for calculating wave velocities in blood vessels" 
 L. Marinelli, CJ Hardy, "Method for reconstructing images"

References

1957 births
Living people
21st-century American physicists
Fellows of the American Institute for Medical and Biological Engineering
Fellows of the American Physical Society